Elfriede Hirnschall (born 16 February 1945) is an Austrian gymnast. She competed in six events at the 1960 Summer Olympics.

References

1945 births
Living people
Austrian female artistic gymnasts
Olympic gymnasts of Austria
Gymnasts at the 1960 Summer Olympics
Sportspeople from Vienna
20th-century Austrian women